Harold William Godfrey (born 21 April 1948) is an Anglican bishop who was Bishop of Peru from 1998 to 2017.

He was educated at Chesterfield School, trained for the ministry at King's College London (AKC; Jelf Medal) and spent his last year there at St Augustine's College, Canterbury. He was Bishop of Uruguay from 1988 to 1998.

References

1948 births
Living people
Alumni of the Theological Department of King's College London
Associates of King's College London
20th-century Anglican bishops in South America
21st-century Anglican bishops in South America

Anglican bishops of Uruguay
Anglican bishops of Peru